Sir Kai Ho, CMG, JP, MRCS (21 March 1859 – 21 July 1914), better known as Sir Kai Ho Kai, born Ho Shan-kai, was a Hong Kong barrister, physician and essayist in Colonial Hong Kong. He played a key role in the relationship between the Hong Kong local community and the British colonial government. He is remembered as a supporter of the Reform Movement and as a teacher of Sun Yat-sen, who would become the founding father of the Republic of China. Kai Tak Airport, Hong Kong, was named after him and his son-in-law Au Tak, though he died in 1914, long before the idea of an aerodrome was first mentioned in 1925.

Early years

Kai Ho was the fourth son of Ho Tsun-shin (Hoh Fuk Tong 何福堂) of the London Missionary Society and brother of Ho Miu-ling (wife of Wu Tingfang, Hong Kong's first Chinese barrister and first Chinese member of the Legislative Council, later Chinese Consul-General to the USA).

In 1872, at the age of 13, Ho was sent to the United Kingdom to study at Palmer House school, Margate, Kent.  In September 1875, he registered at the University of Aberdeen. In 1879, he received his MBCM and went to St Thomas' Hospital to take up clinical training.  He became the first Chinese qualified physician and graduated from Aberdeen University in the same year.  He then studied law at Lincoln's Inn and was called to the bar in 1881.

Career

Ho returned to Hong Kong in early 1882, and embarked on changing the landscape of Hong Kong's colleges and universities.  The Chinese culture at that time placed a heavy emphasis on traditional Chinese medicine and the Chinese people in the late 19th century were largely sceptical about Western medicine. Sir Kai not only gained the people's acceptance, but also helped the British make possible a number of health-related establishments that otherwise would have been misunderstood by the public.  

In 1887, the Hong Kong College of Medicine for Chinese was opened. He made it an initiative that Chinese medicine practitioners too could benefit from an institution that focused on Western medicine. This College later became the basis from which the University of Hong Kong was established in 1910.
Throughout his lifetime, he was a vocal supporter for Sun Yat-sen and his revolution to overthrow China's Manchu-led Qing dynasty. A prolific critic of the Self-Strengthening Movement, Ho advocated China to follow the British system in developing constitutional monarchy.

An example of Ho's support was his defence of the 1884 Praya rioters dubiously charged by the colonial administration with the offence of refusing to accept work, the riots being an event Sun Yat-sen said cemented his determination to bring about that revolution.  As a minority and Unofficial member of the Legislative Council he had effected limits to legislation that were discriminatory towards Chinese.  He criticised the proposed Summoning of Chinese Ordinance, Cap. 40 of 1899, as "class legislation" and succeeded, with Wei A Yuk (韋玉), in limiting its effect to finite periods of two years at a time.  

Yet, in 1888, in an effort to protect the property interests of the Chinese elite of which he was a leading member, he stiffly opposed the passing of the Public Health Ordinance which proved a vital step in the development of Hong Kong's public hygiene.

Ho was made a Companion of the Most Distinguished Order of Saint Michael and Saint George in 1902 and was knighted in 1912.

In 1912, Ho went into a partnership with his son-in-law Au Tak. It was a land reclamation development project of houses and recreation grounds.  The project was named Kai Tak Bund, but it was a failure and was liquidated in 1924. The land was taken back by the government, and was later used by a flying school, then a flying club, then as an airfield for the Royal Navy and Royal Air Force, and finally became what would be the world-famous Kai Tak International Airport.

Through his sister, Ho Miu-ling, he was the uncle of Wu Chaoshu, a Minister of Foreign Affairs and Ambassador to the United States of the Republic of China.

Additional roles

Ho was a member of the Legislative Council of Hong Kong, a member of the Sanitary Board, and Justice of the Peace. He was, in 1895, appointed to the governing body of Queen's College.

He was a key player in many aspects of early Hong Kong development, including the 1894 Hong Kong plague, the founding of Alice Memorial Hospital and the founding of the Po Leung Kuk.

Personal life

In probably the first ever Anglo-Chinese marriage, on 13 December 1881 he married Alice Walkden (3 February 1852 – 8 June 1884), eldest daughter of John Walkden, of Blackheath, at St Aubyn's Congregational Church, Upper Norwood, London, England.  The couple returned to Hong Kong after his studies.  Alice gave birth to a daughter, but died of typhoid fever in Hong Kong in 1884.  The daughter was taken to England to be brought up by Alice's relatives but she died young and was never married. Alice was English. Kai Ho later married Lily Lai Yuk-hing (d. 1945) and the couple had 17 children.

Alice Ho Miu Ling Nethersole Hospital is named for his wife Alice and sister Ho Miu-ling.

Death

Sir Kai died in 1914 and was buried at Hong Kong Happy Valley Cemetery near his first wife Alice.

Due to the failure of his various business projects and ill health he died heavily in debt, without a will, and his family destitute.

References

Further reading
  Choa, G. H. (2000) .The Life and Times of Sir Kai Ho Kai, Chinese University Press 

Hong Kong legal professionals
Hong Kong writers
1859 births
1914 deaths
Hong Kong justices of the peace
Alumni of the University of Aberdeen
Companions of the Order of St Michael and St George
Knights Bachelor
Place of birth missing
Members of the Legislative Council of Hong Kong
Members of the Sanitary Board of Hong Kong
Members of Lincoln's Inn